Tropidophorus sinicus, the Chinese water skink,  is a species of skink found in China and Vietnam.

References

sinicus
Reptiles of China
Reptiles of Vietnam
Reptiles described in 1886
Taxa named by Oskar Boettger